Robert John O'Dea (27 January 1930 – 16 July 1986) was a New Zealand rugby union player. A flanker, O'Dea represented Thames Valley at a provincial level, and was a member of the New Zealand national side, the All Blacks, on their 1953–54 tour of Britain, Ireland, France and North America. He played five matches on that tour but did not appear in any internationals.

O'Dea's grandsons, Edwin, Ben and Sam O'Dea, are noted beach volleyball players.

References

1930 births
1986 deaths
Rugby union players from Gisborne, New Zealand
New Zealand rugby union players
New Zealand international rugby union players
Thames Valley rugby union players
Rugby union flankers
People educated at Morrinsville College